Jovan Krkobabić (27 February 1930 – 22 April 2014) was a Serbian politician. He was the leader of the Party of United Pensioners of Serbia, Deputy Prime Minister of Serbia in charge of social affairs, appointed on 7 July 2008 and Minister of Labour, Employment and Social Policies from 27 July 2012 until his death on 22 April 2014.

Personal life
His surname derived from the last name Babić of his ancestors who lived near Krka river in Skradin.

Career
Krkobabić graduated from the University of Belgrade's  Faculty of Political Sciences, where he earned his doctoral degree.

His party contested the 2007 Serbian parliamentary election together with Nebojša Čović's Social Democratic Party and won no seats. PUPS also took part in 2008 parliamentary election coalition with the Socialist Party of Serbia and United Serbia and won five seats.

Death
Jovan Krkobabić died in 2014, aged 84. His successor as party leader is his son, Milan Krkobabić.

References

Sources
 Biography on party website

External links

1930 births
2014 deaths
People from Vrlika
Politicians from Belgrade
Serbs of Croatia
Party of United Pensioners of Serbia politicians
Deputy Prime Ministers of Serbia
Government ministers of Serbia
University of Belgrade Faculty of Political Science alumni